Chaiti ghoda is one of the popular folk dance forms of Odisha specially performed by aboriginal fishermen tribes like the Keot (Kaibarta). Chaiti represent the chaitra month of the year i.e. from March to April to the full moon in Baisakh i.e. from April to May and ghoda means horse in Odia and Hindi. There is a story when lord rama crossed the river with the help of aboriginal Keot fishermen and in return lord rama given a horse to the fishermen.

Dummy Horse made from wood, beautifully painted and surrounded by colorful cloths is used as a prop. All fishermen dance and their wives are co-dancers/singers. Men are called Rauta in this dance and women are called Rautani.

Two horses are used as black horse and white horse. The festival is celebrated for eight days in honour of vasuli devi. Vasuli devi is the main deity of fishermen tribes. It is celebrated to take the blessings of the deity of this ethnic group.

References

Folk dances of Odisha